In enzymology, an ATP deaminase is an enzyme that catalyzes the chemical reaction

ATP + H2O  ITP + NH3

Thus, the two substrates of this enzyme are ATP and H2O, whereas its two products are ITP and NH3.

This enzyme belongs to the family of hydrolases, those acting on carbon-nitrogen bonds other than peptide bonds, specifically in cyclic amidines.  The systematic name of this enzyme class is ATP aminohydrolase. This enzyme is also called adenosine triphosphate deaminase.

References

 

EC 3.5.4
Enzymes of unknown structure